Urszula may refer to:

Franciszka Urszula Radziwiłłowa (1705–1753), Polish-Lithuania-Belarusian noble dramatist and writer
Urszula Augustyn (born 1964), Polish politician
Urszula Dudziak (born 1943), Polish jazz vocalist
Urszula Gacek (born 1963), British-born Polish member of the European Parliament
Urszula Kasprzak, usually known simply as Urszula (born 1960), Polish singer
Urszula Kielan (born 1960), retired high jumper from Poland
Urszula Krupa (born 1949), Polish politician and Member of the European Parliament
Urszula Mayerin (1570–1635), mistress to King Sigismund III of Poland
Urszula Modrzyńska (born 1928), Polish stage and film actress
Urszula Piwnicka, née Jasińska (born 1983), Polish javelin thrower
Urszula Plenkiewicz (1921–2021), Polish scout and liaison officer
Urszula Radwańska (born 1990), Polish tennis player
Urszula Sadkowska (born 1984), Polish judoka
Urszula Sipińska (born 1947), Polish singer-songwriter, pianist and architect
Urszula Urbaniak (born 1967), Polish filmmaker and TV director
Urszula Włodarczyk (born 1965), retired Polish heptathlete
Urszula Zamoyska (1750–1808), Polish noblewoman and socialite

See also

Ursula (disambiguation)
Urszulin (disambiguation)

Polish feminine given names